Kirkcaldy Greyhound Track was a former greyhound racing track in Kirkcaldy, Fife, Scotland.

Greyhound Racing took place on the 2,300 capacity Kirkcaldy and District Track and Sports Ground off Oriel Road, south of Masserene Road. Adjacent to the west side of the stadium was the Sunnybrae Plantation. The first race meeting was on 15 December 1934 and independent (unlicensed) racing continued for 35 years. The race nights consisted of Thursday and Saturday evenings. The circumference of the track was 365 yards and the race distances were 235 and 410 yards.

References

Defunct greyhound racing venues in the United Kingdom
Greyhound racing in Scotland
Kirkcaldy